Vicente Casanova y Marzol (16 April 1854 – 23 October 1930) was a Spanish Cardinal of the Roman Catholic Church who served as Archbishop of Granada from 1921 until his death, and was elevated to the cardinalate in 1925.

Biography
Vicente Casanova y Marzol was born in Borja, and studied at the seminaries in Zaragoza and in Madrid. He was ordained to the priesthood in 1881, and obtained his licentiate in theology in Valencia in 1882. He then served as a pastor in Maluenda, Alfaro, and for many years in the parish of Nuestra Señora del Buen Consejo in Madrid.

On 19 December 1907 Casanova was appointed Bishop of Almería by Pope Pius X. He received his episcopal consecration on 25 March 1908 from Archbishop Antonio Vico, with Bishops José Salvador y Barrera and Julián de Diego y García Alcolea serving as co-consecrators. Casanova was later named Archbishop of Granada on 7 March 1921.

Pope Pius XI created him Cardinal Priest of Ss. Vitale, Valeria, Gervasio e Protasio in the consistory of 30 March 1925. He was among the clerics who blessed King Alfonso XIII during a ceremony celebrating the twenty-fifth anniversary of his investiture as King of Spain.

The Cardinal died in Zaragoza, at age 76, while he was attending the third National Catechetical Congress. He is buried in the metropolitan cathedral of Granada.

References

External links
Cardinals of the Holy Roman Church
Catholic-Hierarchy 

1854 births
1930 deaths
20th-century Spanish cardinals
20th-century Roman Catholic archbishops in Spain
Burials at Granada Cathedral
Archbishops of Granada